Chipundo is a city and commune of Angola, located in the province of Cuando Cubango.

See also 

 Communes of Angola

References 

Populated places in Cuando Cubango Province
Municipalities of Angola